Dillon Day (born August 18, 1970 in Ohio, United States) is a pornographic actor and director.

Biography
Day was married to Dasha but is now married to fellow pornographic actress Victoria Rush. He initially pursued a career in Hollywood and appeared in Bio-Dome and the 1994 film Widow's Kiss. In 2002, his father decided to enter the adult film industry as well, making his debut in Sin City's Island Rain and using the stage name Poppa Wad.

Awards and nominations

References

External links 
 
 
 

1970 births
Living people
American male pornographic film actors
American pornographic film directors